Russell M. Artzt (born January 23, 1947) is an American businessesman and software developer. He co-founded Computer Associates (now CA Technologies) with Charles B. Wang.

Career
He met Wang in the 1960s while he was working at the Electronic Laboratories at Columbia University. They became friends and later both joined Standard Data, before founding CA in 1976.

In 2015, he left his role as co-chairman on CA Technologies’ Board of Directors. He currently serves as the executive chairman of RingLead, a cloud-based data management company.

References

External links 
Haefner bio,  Forbes.com
Wang bio, mediamente.rai.it
Artzt bio, ca.com

Living people
1947 births
American businesspeople
People from Old Westbury, New York